Aglossa capsalis is a species of snout moth in the genus Aglossa. It was described by Pierre Chrétien in 1911 and is known from Tunisia (it was described from Gafsa).

References

Moths described in 1911
Pyralini
Endemic fauna of Tunisia
Moths of Africa